AG Spalding and Bros v AW Gamage Ltd, (1915) 84 LJ Ch 449, (1915) 113 LT 198, (1915) 31 TLR 328, [1914-15] All ER Rep 147, (1915) 32 RPC 273, is a leading decision of the House of Lords on the tort of passing off. The Court established a three-part test for a successful claim of passing off. First, the claimant's product must have goodwill. Second, there must be a misrepresentation by the defendant's product, and third, there must be damages inflicted upon the claimant.

See also
 List of trademark case law

1915 in case law
House of Lords cases
1915 in British law
English law articles needing infoboxes